The Rudé Právo Cup was an ice hockey tournament that existed from 1977-1983. The tournament was sponsored by Rudé právo, the official newspaper of the Communist Party of Czechoslovakia.

The Soviet Union won all five tournaments held, while Czechoslovakia in turn finished second in all of them.

Results

References

 
Ice hockey tournaments in Europe
Ice hockey competitions in Czechoslovakia